Lee Deuk-choon (Hangul: 이득춘, born 16 July 1962) is a retired male badminton player from South Korea.  In 2013, he became head coach of the Korean National Badminton Team after nearly 20 years as the head coach of the Junior National Team.  He replaced Kim Joong-soo, who was the acting head coach following the removal of Sung Han-kook.  Lee was replaced as head coach on January 1, 2017 by Kang Kyung-jin.

Career
He won a silver medal at the 1987 IBF World Championships in mixed doubles with Chung Myung-hee and the same year, he and Chung won the mixed title at the All England Open Badminton Championships.

Achievements

IBF World Grand Prix 
The World Badminton Grand Prix sanctioned by International Badminton Federation (IBF) from 1983 to 2006.

Men's doubles

References 

South Korean male badminton players
Asian Games medalists in badminton
Badminton players at the 1982 Asian Games
Badminton players at the 1986 Asian Games
Badminton coaches
1962 births
Living people
Asian Games gold medalists for South Korea
Asian Games silver medalists for South Korea
Asian Games bronze medalists for South Korea
Medalists at the 1982 Asian Games
Medalists at the 1986 Asian Games